Saint Mary of Sorrows Roman Catholic Church, is located at 938 Genesee Street, Buffalo, New York in the city's east side. The building is a City of Buffalo landmark and former Catholic parish church within the Diocese of Buffalo.

History
Construction of the church began in 1886 and was completed in 1891. The church was built for a primarily German congregation in a rhenish romanesque revival style with the floor plan laid out as a Latin cross. The church's main tower rises 235 ft (71.63 meters) high. In 1985, the church was shuttered and the Catholic Diocese considered demolishing it.

Current Use
The building underwent renovations from 1986 to 1996 which included a new roof, repairs to bell tower, façade cleaning, and life safety systems. The building is now known as the King Urban Life Center and contains the King Center Charter School. Four classrooms were built in the sanctuary space with the chancel and altar being left primarily intact.

Gallery

References

External links 
 King Center Charter School
 Skyscraperpage entry

Roman Catholic churches completed in 1891
Roman Catholic churches in Buffalo, New York
German-American culture in Buffalo, New York
Roman Catholic churches in New York (state)
Buildings and structures in Buffalo, New York
19th-century Roman Catholic church buildings in the United States